P&O Cruises is a British cruise line based at Carnival House in Southampton, England, operated by Carnival UK and owned by Carnival Corporation & plc. It was originally a subsidiary of the shipping company P&O and was founded in 1977. Along with P&O Cruises Australia, another former subsidiary of P&O, it has the oldest heritage of any cruise line in the world, dating to P&O's first passenger operations in 1837.

P&O Cruises was divested from P&O in 2000, subsequently becoming a subsidiary of P&O Princess Cruises, before coming under its current ownership in 2003, following a merger between P&O Princess Cruises and Carnival Corporation.

History

Origins

In 1834, Brodie McGhie Willcox, a ship broker from London, and Arthur Anderson, a sailor from the Shetland Islands, formed an association with Captain Richard Bourne, a steamship owner from Dublin. In 1837, the trio won a contract and began transporting mail and passengers from England to the Iberian Peninsula, founding the Peninsular Steam Navigation Company. In 1840, the company merged with the Transatlantic Steam Ship Company and expanded their operations to the Orient, becoming the Peninsular and Oriental Steam Navigation Company (P&O). In 1844, P&O expanded its passenger operations from transportation to include leisure cruising, operating sailings from England to the Mediterranean that were the first of their kind. By the mid-1900s, passenger shipping for the purposes of transportation was threatened by the increasing affordability of air travel. Consequently, in the 1970s, P&O dedicated its passenger operations entirely to leisure cruising and, in 1977, relisted its passenger ships under the new subsidiary P&O Cruises.

1977–1995: Early years

Initially, P&O Cruises operated Oriana and Canberra from Southampton, serving the UK market, and Arcadia from Sydney, serving the Australian market, while Uganda operated educational cruises. All of these ships had previously operated for P&O and had been transferred to the new subsidiary. In 1979, Arcadia departed the Australian fleet and was replaced by Sea Princess, which had previously been Kungsholm for Flagship Cruises. In 1981, Oriana relocated to serve the Australian market, while Sea Princess relocated to serve the UK market in 1982. The same year, Canberra was requisitioned as a troopship during the Falklands War, while Uganda was requisitioned as a hospital ship. Uganda departed the fleet shortly thereafter, in 1983. Oriana departed the Australian fleet in March 1986, and Sea Princess departed the UK fleet in November 1986. With only Canberra remaining, serving the UK market, P&O diverged its Australian operations in 1988, acquiring Sitmar Cruises, which already operated a ship in Australia. This led to the formation of P&O Cruises Australia, which would oversee Australian operations, while P&O Cruises continued to oversee UK operations.

1995–2008: First newbuilds and changes of ownership

In the 1990s, P&O Cruises commissioned its first newbuild, the second Oriana, which entered service in April 1995. Unlike the older ocean liners the company had inherited from P&O, which had been designed to transport passengers from one place to another, the new Oriana was a cruise ship, built purely for pleasure cruising. At 69,153 gross tons, she was one of the largest in the world. Sea Princess also returned to the fleet in 1995, under the new name Victoria. Canberra departed the fleet in 1997 and was replaced the same year by a second Arcadia, which had previously been Star Princess for Princess Cruises. In 2000, Aurora, a newbuild of similar design to Oriana, entered service for P&O Cruises. However, her service suffered an inauspicious start when she was forced to abandon her maiden voyage due to mechanical problems. The same year, P&O divested all its cruise operations and formed the independent company P&O Princess Cruises, which now owned P&O Cruises. In 2002, Victoria departed the fleet and Oceana joined, having previously been Ocean Princess for Princess Cruises.

In 2003, the ownership of P&O Cruises changed once again when P&O Princess Cruises merged with Carnival Corporation to form Carnival Corporation & plc. Thereafter, Arcadia transferred to the new Ocean Village brand. Adonia, previously Sea Princess and a sister to Oceana, replaced Arcadia but returned to Princess Cruises in 2005. Adonia was replaced the same year by a newbuild Arcadia, which was allocated to P&O Cruises after having originally been intended for Holland America Line and thereafter Cunard Line. Arcadia was joined by Artemis, previously Royal Princess for Princess Cruises.

2008–present: Expansion, modernisation, and COVID-19

The fleet expanded and modernised with the addition of the 116,017-ton newbuild Ventura in 2008, and her sister Azura in 2010. Artemis departed the fleet in 2011 and was replaced by a second Adonia, which like Artemis had previously been Royal Princess for Princess Cruises. In 2012, P&O Cruises celebrated the 175th anniversary of the Peninsular Steam Navigation Company by staging a 'Grand Event', in which the entire fleet was assembled in Southampton. In 2014, the company introduced a new livery, based on the Union Jack, to emphasise its British heritage, and in 2015, the 143,730-ton newbuild Britannia joined the fleet. Adonia transferred to Carnival's new Fathom brand in 2016, returned in 2017, and then departed the fleet permanently in 2018. In 2019, the company's first newbuild, Oriana, also departed the fleet.

In March 2020, P&O Cruises joined every other cruise line worldwide in suspending passenger operations as a precaution against the emergent COVID-19 pandemic. This led to the departure of Oceana in July 2020, as Carnival sold multiple older ships across their fleets in order to increase liquidity. It also delayed the arrival of the 184,089-ton newbuild Iona from May 2020 to October 2020. Iona was the UK's first ship to be powered by liquefied natural gas (LNG) rather than fuel oil, which was intended to make her more environmentally friendly. The company resumed passenger operations in June 2021, after fifteen months, with Britannia being the first of the fleet to sail, followed by Iona in August 2021.

In March 2022, P&O Cruises suffered a public backlash following a mass firing of staff by P&O Ferries, another former subsidiary of P&O. They subsequently embarked on an advertising campaign in national newspapers and on social media in order to clarify their separate ownership.

Arvia, a sister ship to Iona, joined the fleet in December 2022.

Golden Cockerel
P&O Cruises awards the company's Golden Cockerel trophy to the fastest ship in its fleet. The trophy is currently held by Aurora, which achieved a speed of 25.7 knots in April 2019. It was previously held by the first Oriana until her retirement in 1986, Canberra until her retirement in 1997, and the second Oriana until her retirement in 2019.

Fleet

Current fleet

Previous fleet

References

External links

 
 P&O Cruises Australia
 The Last Ocean Liners (trade routes and ships of P&O-Orient Lines in the 1950s, 60s and 70s)

 
Carnival Corporation & plc
Cruise lines